Babai (also Romanized as Bābā’ī) is a village in Hasanabad Rural District, Hasanabad District, Eqlid County, Fars Province, Iran. At the 2006 census, its population was 495, in 112 families.

References 

Populated places in Eqlid County